The Stafford Township School District is a community public school district that serves students in pre-kindergarten through sixth grade from Stafford Township, in Ocean County, New Jersey, United States.

As of the 2018–19 school year, the district, comprising five schools, had an enrollment of 2,198 students and 190.0 classroom teachers (on an FTE basis), for a student–teacher ratio of 11.6:1.

The district participates in the Interdistrict Public School Choice Program, having been approved in July 2002 to participate in the program. Seats in the program for non-resident students are specified by the district and are allocated by lottery, with tuition paid for participating students by the New Jersey Department of Education.

The district is classified by the New Jersey Department of Education as being in District Factor Group "DE", the fifth-highest of eight groupings. District Factor Groups organize districts statewide to allow comparison by common socioeconomic characteristics of the local districts. From lowest socioeconomic status to highest, the categories are A, B, CD, DE, FG, GH, I and J.

For seventh through twelfth grades, public school students are served by the Southern Regional School District, which serves the five municipalities in the Long Beach Island Consolidated School District — Barnegat Light, Harvey Cedars, Long Beach Township, Ship Bottom and Surf City — along with students from Beach Haven and Stafford Township, together with students from Ocean Township who attend as part of a sending/receiving relationship with the Ocean Township School District. Schools in the district (with 2018–19 enrollment data from the National Center for Education Statistics) are 
Southern Regional Middle School with 934 students in grades 7–8 and 
Southern Regional High School with 1,952 students in grades 9–12. Both schools are in the Manahawkin section of Stafford Township.

At the time of its founding in 1957, the Southern Regional School District had a roughly equal number of students from Long Beach Island and Stafford Township. By 2016, the overwhelming majority of students were from Stafford Township, accounting for nearly 90% of enrollment. These demographic changes have led to significant discrepancies in the cost per pupil sent to the district from each community, with Harvey Cedars and Long Beach Township paying more than $200,000 per pupil, while Stafford Township's costs are $3,600 for each student. These widely different costs result from a formula that uses the taxable property value in each municipality to apportion costs, which means that municipalities with relatively high property values and small numbers of students pay a higher share of total district costs. Some residents of Long Beach Island communities are seeking to amend the formula to take advantage of a 1993 law that allows districts to use both property value and enrollment to allocate property taxes, though that would require passage of referendums in each municipality.

Schools
Schools in the district (with 2018–19 enrollment data from the National Center for Education Statistics) are:
Preschool
Oxycocus School with 178 students in pre-kindergarten)
William Wilkinson, Principal
Ronald L. Meinders Primary Learning Center with 274 students in kindergarten
Dawn Reo, Principal
Elementary schools
Ocean Acres Elementary School with 527 students in grades 1 and 2
Susan D'Alessandro, Principal
McKinley Avenue Elementary School with 570 students in grades 3 and 4
Tiffany Eberle, Principal
Intermediate school
Stafford Intermediate School with 651 students in grades 5 and 6
Sean Reilly, Principal

Administration
Core members of the district's administration are:
George Chidiac, Superintendent
Lourdes LaGuardia, Business Administrator / Board Secretary

Board of education
The district's board of education, with nine members, sets policy and oversees the fiscal and educational operation of the district through its administration. As a Type II school district, the board's trustees are elected directly by voters to serve three-year terms of office on a staggered basis, with three seats up for election each year held (since 2012) as part of the November general election. The board appoints a superintendent to oversee the day-to-day operation of the district.

References

External links
Stafford Township School District

School Data for the Stafford Township School District, National Center for Education Statistics
Southern Regional School District
Ocean County Vocational Technical School District

Stafford Township, New Jersey
New Jersey District Factor Group DE
School districts in Ocean County, New Jersey